Eileen Emily Paisley, Baroness Paisley of St George's, Lady Bannside (born 2 November 1931), is a Northern Irish Unionist politician, a vice-president of the Democratic Unionist Party, and the widow of Ian Paisley, Lord Bannside, former leader of the DUP. She became a life peer in 2006.  She retired from the House of Lords on 30 October 2017.

Early life

Eileen Emily Cassells married Ian Richard Kyle Paisley on 13 October 1956.  They had five children together, a daughter Rhonda (a graduate of Bob Jones University, who served as a member of Belfast City Council but has long since left politics), and two further daughters Sharon and Cherith. They also have twin sons, Kyle and Ian (the former a Free Presbyterian minister, the latter a DUP MP).

Career

Eileen Paisley was elected as a councillor in Belfast in 1967 for the Protestant Unionist Party, the forerunner to the DUP, three years before her husband was elected to Stormont and Westminster. She was also elected to the Northern Ireland Assembly in 1973 and the Northern Ireland Constitutional Convention in 1975, representing Belfast East both times.

It was announced on 11 April 2006 that she would be one of the first three members of the DUP to be created a life peer. She was gazetted on 14 June 2006 as Baroness Paisley of St George's, of St George's in the County of Antrim, after the ward that she represented on Belfast City Council. She was introduced to the House of Lords on 3 July 2006. In June 2010, she gained the additional title, by courtesy, of Lady Bannside, of North Antrim in the County of Antrim, when her husband was also elevated to the peerage as Ian chose not to be titled "Lord Paisley" on the grounds that it would have devalued Eileen's title if he had. From 6 June 2013, Paisley was on a leave of absence from the House of Lords before retiring in October 2017.

In a December 2015 interview with the BBC, Paisley stated that she would "not go out of her way" to vote for the DUP in future elections following the party's alleged "betrayal" over her late husband's resignation as party leader in 2008.

Arms

References

External links
Eileen Paisley, Trimble new peers, BBC News,  11 April 2006
Baroness Paisley takes Lords seat, BBC News,  3 July 2006

1931 births
Democratic Unionist Party politicians
Life peeresses created by Elizabeth II
Living people
Members of Belfast City Council
Members of the Northern Ireland Assembly 1973–1974
Members of the Northern Ireland Constitutional Convention
Presbyterians from Northern Ireland
Democratic Unionist Party life peers
Female members of the Northern Ireland Assembly
Spouses of life peers
Women councillors in Northern Ireland